Dolichocebus is an extinct New World monkey genus that lived in Argentine Patagonia (Sarmiento Formation) from about 21 to 17.5 million years ago during the Early Miocene (Colhuehuapian in the SALMA classification). The type species is D. gaimanensis.

References

†Dolichocebus
Prehistoric monkeys
Prehistoric primate genera
Miocene primates of South America
Colhuehuapian
Neogene Argentina
Fossils of Argentina
Fossil taxa described in 1942
Golfo San Jorge Basin
Sarmiento Formation